Mary Thornycroft (née Francis; 1809 – 1 February 1895) was a British sculptor who sculpted many different busts, fragments and statues. She frequently choose infants and children as her subjects and was commissioned by Queen Victoria to create a number of statues and portraits of her children and other members of the Royal Family. Several of these are now in the British Royal Collection.

Biography
The daughter of sculptor John Francis and his wife Mary, Thornycroft was born at Thornham in Norfolk. She studied sculpture under her father, and first exhibited a work, a bust of him, at the Royal Academy in London in 1835, aged 21. Her 1839 exhibition piece, The Orphan Flowergirl received good reviews.

In 1840, she married Thomas Thornycroft, a student of her father. The couple travelled to Italy and lived and worked in Rome for some years. While in Rome, Mary Thornycroft became friends with the sculptors Bertel Thorvaldsen and John Gibson. On her return to London, Gibson recommended her services to Queen Victoria. Gibson’s recommendation marked the beginning of a sequence of royal commissions for Thornycroft lasting from 1844 to 1877. These included The Four Seasons, a series of life-size statues of Victoria's children that were much praised and reproduced as engravings and in several art journals. The drawing-room at Osborne House contained nine life-size marble statues of the young princes and princesses that were modeled by Thornycroft. She also created busts of the Queen in 1840, of the Duchess of Gloucester and, in 1846, of the Prince of Wales. Her 1863 bust of Princess Alexandra, Princess of Wales was reproduced in Parian ware for the domestic retail market.

Thornycroft also executed a number of busts of private individuals, as well as a few ideal statues. Among the latter is her figure of a Skipping Girl. She was a regular exhibitor at the Royal Academy from 1835 until 1871 and at the British Institution from 1845 to 1864.

Mary Thornycroft's primary artistic practice was sculpture in marble and sometimes bronze. Her style was naturalistic with details that displayed the personal expressions of her subjects. As a woman her commissions were limited therefore, she capitalized on her craft on subjects that were easily reachable for her to study, notably infants and children. This was an advantage because this is how she gained her notable royal commissions. She worked with her husband on a frequent basis making attribution of individual pieces sometimes difficult. It is known that the couple, along with their son Hamo Thornycroft, worked together during 1875 on The Poets' Fountain at Hyde Park Corner in central London and which was damaged beyond repair in a World War II air raid.

Thornycroft gave sculpting lessons to Princess Louise who was one of Queen Victoria’s daughters and who became a notable sculptor in her own right.

Family
The Thornycrofts had six children who grew to adulthood, two sons (Hamo and John Isaac), and four daughters (Alyce, Theresa, Helen and Frances). Hamo Thornycroft became a sculptor while daughters Alyce, Theresa Thornycroft, and Helen Thornycroft became artists. John Isaac Thornycroft became a marine engineer. The Thornycrofts were the grandparents of Siegfried Sassoon, the war poet, through their daughter Theresa, who married Alfred Ezra Sassoon.

Selected artworks

The Four Seasons 
 Victoria (1840-1901), Princess Royal as 'Summer' c.1850-70 : https://www.rct.uk/collection/search#/25/collection/53263/victoria-1840-1901-princess-royal-as-summer
 Albert Edward, Prince of Wales (1841-1910) as 'Winter' c. 1850 : https://www.rct.uk/collection/search#/28/collection/53090/albert-edward-prince-of-wales-1841-1910-as-winter
 Prince Alfred (1844-1900) as 'Autumn' c.1847 : https://www.rct.uk/collection/search#/13/collection/34682/prince-alfred-1844-1900-as-autumn
 Victoria (1840-1901), Princess Royal, as 'Summer' signed & dated 1847 : https://www.rct.uk/collection/search#/14/collection/1565/victoria-1840-1901-princess-royal-as-summer
 Albert Edward (1841-1910), Prince of Wales, as 'Winter'. c.1847 : https://www.rct.uk/collection/search#/16/collection/1567/albert-edward-1841-1910-prince-of-wales-as-winter
 Prince Alfred (1844-1900) as 'Autumn' 1847 : https://www.rct.uk/collection/search#/15/collection/1566/prince-alfred-1844-1900-as-autumn
 Princess Alice (1843-1878) as 'Spring' c.1850-70 : https://www.rct.uk/collection/search#/47/collection/53097/princess-alice-1843-1878-as-spring

Busts 
 Prince Alfred: https://www.rct.uk/collection/search#/30/collection/2112/prince-alfred-1844-1900
 Alexandria, Princess of Wales: https://www.rct.uk/collection/search#/21/collection/2094/alexandra-princess-of-wales-1844-1925
 -Princess Alice https://www.rct.uk/collection/search#/9/collection/2086/princess-alice-1843-1878-0
 -Grand Duchess Marie Alexandrovna, Duchess of Edinburgh: https://www.rct.uk/collection/search#/3/collection/2092/grand-duchess-marie-alexandrovna-duchess-of-edinburgh-1853-1920
 -Albert, Duke of Schleswig-Holstein: https://www.rct.uk/collection/search#/44/collection/2101/albert-duke-of-schleswig-holstein-1869-1931
 -Princess Helena: https://www.rct.uk/collection/search#/53/collection/41292/princess-helena-1846-1923
 -Princess Louise: https://www.rct.uk/collection/search#/54/collection/41293/princess-louise-1848-1939

Fragments 
 -Leg and Foot of Prince Alfred : https://www.rct.uk/collection/search#/5/collection/42012/leg-and-foot-of-prince-alfred
 -Princess Helena : https://www.rct.uk/collection/search#/8/collection/42014/princess-helena-1846-1923
 -Princess Beatrice : https://www.rct.uk/collection/search#/6/collection/55236/princess-beatrice-1857-1944
 -Left arm and Hand of Princess Louise : https://www.rct.uk/collection/search#/2/collection/34578/left-arm-and-hand-of-princess-louise
 -Prince Leopold : https://www.rct.uk/collection/search#/10/collection/34357/prince-leopold-1853-1884
 -Prince Alfred : https://www.rct.uk/collection/search#/58/collection/34581/prince-alfred-1844-1900

Full Body compositions 
 Victoria (1868-1935) and Maud (1869-1938) of Wales signed & dated 1877 : https://www.rct.uk/collection/search#/61/collection/2073/victoria-1868-1935-and-maud-1869-1938-of-wales
 Louise of Wales (1867-1931) signed & dated 1877 : https://www.rct.uk/collection/search#/60/collection/2072/louise-of-wales-1867-1931
 Princess Louise (1848-1939) as 'Plenty' c.1853-70 : https://www.rct.uk/collection/search#/51/collection/53089/princess-louise-1848-1939-as-plenty
 Princess Helena (1846-1923) as 'Peace' c.1850-70 : https://www.rct.uk/collection/search#/46/collection/53096/princess-helena-1846-1923-as-peace
 Prince Arthur (1850-1942) as a Hunter. c.1850-70 : https://www.rct.uk/collection/search#/48/collection/53098/prince-arthur-1850-1942-as-a-hunter
 Prince Leopold (1853-1884) as a Fisher Boy c.1860 : https://www.rct.uk/collection/search#/44/collection/53088/prince-leopold-1853-1884-as-a-fisher-boy
 Prince Leopold (1853-1884) as a Fisher Boy c.1858-60 : https://www.rct.uk/collection/search#/42/collection/41290/prince-leopold-1853-1884-as-a-fisher-boy
 Prince Arthur (1850-1942) as a Hunter 1859 : https://www.rct.uk/collection/search#/41/collection/41285/prince-arthur-1850-1942-as-a-hunter
 Princess Beatrice (1857-1944) in the Nautilus Shell signed & dated 1858 : https://www.rct.uk/collection/search#/38/collection/41291/princess-beatrice-1857-1944-in-the-nautilus-shell
 Princess Helena (1846-1923) as 'Peace' signed & dated 1856 : https://www.rct.uk/collection/search#/34/collection/41295/princess-helena-1846-1923-as-peace
 Princess Helena (1846-1923) as 'Peace' signed & dated 1857 : https://www.rct.uk/collection/search#/35/collection/2170/princess-helena-1846-1923-as-peace
 Princess Louise (1848-1939) as 'Plenty' signed & dated 1857 : https://www.rct.uk/collection/search#/36/collection/2171/princess-louise-1848-1939-as-plenty

References

Attribution

External links

 
 

1809 births
1895 deaths
19th-century English sculptors
19th-century English women artists
English women sculptors
People from Norfolk
Mary